The 2018–19 Air Force Falcons men's ice hockey season was the 51st season of play for the program and the 13th season in the Atlantic Hockey conference. The Falcons represented the United States Air Force Academy and were coached by Frank Serratore, in his 22nd season.

Season
Coming off of two consecutive trips to the NCAA Tournament, Air Force was attempting to live up to very lofty expectations, particularly for an Atlantic Hockey team. Unfortunately, the team got off to a poor start and began the season 1–4. The Falcons recovered afterwards and righted the ship with a 5-game winning streak, placing them near the top of the conference standings. A sweep at the hands of American International in mid-November put them behind the 8-ball at least in terms of a league championship, but a good showing against Bemidji State and in the Ice Vegas Invitational gave the team hope for another NCAA appearance.

The second half of their season began similar to the first half and Air Force went through a stretch of 5 game without a win. They briefly bounced back against Robert Morris but then hovered around .500 for the remainder of the season. Entering the postseason, Air Force had no mathematic chance to make the 2019 NCAA Tournament without winning their conference tournament. That glimmer of hope was quickly snuffed out when they were upset by Niagara in the quarterfinals.

After the season, Billy Christopoulos joined the select few graduates of the Air Force Academy to play professional hockey when he signed with the South Carolina Stingrays.

Departures

Recruiting

Roster

Standings

Schedule and results

|-
!colspan=12 style=";" | Exhibition

|-
!colspan=12 style=";" | Regular Season

|-
!colspan=12 style=";" | 

|-
!colspan=12 style=";" | 

|- align="center" bgcolor="#e0e0e0"
|colspan=12|Air Force lost Series 0–2

Scoring statistics

Goaltending statistics

Rankings

USCHO did not release a poll in Week 25.

Awards and honors

References

Air Force Falcons men's ice hockey seasons
Air Force Falcons
Air Force Falcons
Air Force Falcons
Air Force Falcons